The East Spring Street Historic District is a national historic district located at New Albany, Indiana. The general area is E. Fifth Street to the west, Spring St. to the north, E. Eighth Street to the east, and Market Street to the south.  The Cedar Bough Place Historic District is one block north of the area, the New Albany Downtown Historic District is immediately west of the area, and the Market Street section of the Mansion Row Historic District starts.  The district encompasses 84 contributing buildings in a largely residential section of New Albany.  It developed in the late-19th and early-20th century and includes notable examples of Queen Anne and Italianate style architecture.  Notable buildings include the Third Presbyterian Church (now First Baptist Church, 1853, 1955), St. Mary's Roman Catholic Church and Rectory (1858, 1886), the former John Conner House or Masonic Lodge (c. 1850), and Edwards City Hospital (c. 1890).

It was listed on the National Register of Historic Places in 2001, with a boundary increase in 2020.

In its prime, it was a haven for those of middle-class and upper-class social status.  Many churches are within the area.

Gallery

References

External links
 New Albany Preservation pdf of East Spring Street HD

Historic districts in New Albany, Indiana
National Register of Historic Places in Floyd County, Indiana
Historic districts on the National Register of Historic Places in Indiana
Queen Anne architecture in Indiana
Italianate architecture in Indiana